Marian Danysz (March 17, 1909 – February 9, 1983) was a Polish physicist, Professor of Physics at Warsaw University.

Son of Jan Kazimierz Danysz. In 1952, he co-discovered with Jerzy Pniewski a new kind of matter, an atomic nucleus, which alongside a proton and neutron contains a third particle: the lambda hyperon.

Ten years later, they obtained a hypernucleus in excited state, and the following year a hypernucleus with two lambda hyperons.

20th-century Polish physicists
1909 births
1983 deaths
Fellows of the American Physical Society
French emigrants to Poland